Kévin Edenilson Carabantes Rivera (born 20 March 1995) is a Salvadoran professional footballer who plays as a goalkeeper for Primera División club FAS and El Salvador national team.

He made his debut for the full El Salvador team against Iceland on the 20 January 2020.

References

External links
 

Living people
1995 births
Salvadoran footballers
Association football goalkeepers
El Salvador international footballers
C.D. Chalatenango footballers
Municipal Limeño footballers
C.D. FAS footballers
Salvadoran Primera División players
People from Chalatenango Department
2021 CONCACAF Gold Cup players